Liu Shiquan (born January 1963) is a Chinese missile technology expert and business executive who is the current chairman of the Board of China Aerospace Science and Industry Corporation, in office since May 2022. Previously he served as general manager of China Aerospace Science and Industry Corporation.

He was an alternate member of the 16th, 17th, 18th, and 19th Central Committee of the Chinese Communist Party.

Biography
Liu was born in Daye County (now Daye), Hubei, in January 1963. After resuming the college entrance examination, in 1978, he was admitted to Harbin Institute of Marine Engineering (now Harbin Engineering University), majoring in missile general design. After university in 1982, he was assigned as a technician to the Base Design Institute of the Ministry of Space. In 1984, he became a graduate student in Central China University of Science and Engineering (now Huazhong University of Science and Technology). After graduating in 1987, he was recalled to the original department as an engineer.

He was appointed deputy commander in chief of China Aerospace Science and Industry Corporation, in May 2001, becoming dean of the Fourth Research Institute in December 2011 and general manager in February 2019. On 20 May 2022, he was made chairman of the Board of China Aerospace Science and Industry Corporation.

References

1963 births
Living people
People from Huangshan
Harbin Engineering University alumni
Huazhong University of Science and Technology alumni
People's Republic of China politicians from Hubei
Chinese Communist Party politicians from Hubei
Alternate members of the 16th Central Committee of the Chinese Communist Party    
Alternate members of the 17th Central Committee of the Chinese Communist Party    
Alternate members of the 18th Central Committee of the Chinese Communist Party    
Alternate members of the 19th Central Committee of the Chinese Communist Party